Anders Bastiansen (born October 31, 1980) is a Norwegian professional ice hockey forward currently playing for the Frisk Asker of the Norwegian GET-ligaen  and is an established member and Captain of the Norwegian National Team.

Playing career
Bastiansen began his professional career in his native Norway, with Frisk Asker of the GET-ligaen. After eight seasons within Asker, Bastiansen left for Sweden to play professionally for the next 10 seasons. 
Over his career in Sweden he was awarded the Golden Puck by the Norwegian Ice Hockey Federation after the 2006–07 season when he was with Mora IK.

Prior to the 2008–09 season he signed with Färjestad of the Swedish Elitserien.

On July 24, 2014, after six seasons with Farjestad, Bastiansen left as a free agent to sign a one-year contract with Austrian club, Graz 99ers of the EBEL.

After 11 seasons abroad, Bastiansen announced that he was returning home to Norway with home team, Frisk Asker.

International play
Between 2006 and 2015, Batiansen have represented the Norwegian national team in 10 World Championships, and 2 Olympic Games.

Career statistics

Regular season and playoffs

International

References

External links

1980 births
Living people
Almtuna IS players
Färjestad BK players
Frisk Asker Ishockey players
Graz 99ers players
Ice hockey players at the 2010 Winter Olympics
Ice hockey players at the 2014 Winter Olympics
IFK Arboga IK players
Mora IK players
NIHF Golden Puck winners
Norwegian expatriate ice hockey people
Norwegian ice hockey centres
Olympic ice hockey players of Norway
Ice hockey people from Oslo
Stefan Liv Memorial Trophy winners
Norwegian expatriate sportspeople in Sweden
Norwegian expatriate sportspeople in Austria
Ice hockey players at the 2018 Winter Olympics